Đông Khê is a township and capital of Thạch An District, Cao Bằng Province, Vietnam.

The township was the site of the Battle of Đông Khê.

References

Populated places in Cao Bằng province
District capitals in Vietnam
Townships in Vietnam